Kano Pillars Football Club is a Nigerian professional football club based in Kano, North Western part of Nigeria. They play in the lower division in Nigerian football, the Nigeria National League. Their home stadium is Sani Abacha Stadium. Kano Pillars FC was founded in 1990, the year in which the professional association football league started in Nigeria. It was an amalgamation of three amateur clubs in Kano State.

History
Founded in 1990, By Alhaji Ibrahim Galadima former chairman Nigeria Football Association and former sport commissioner of Kano, from the combination of WRECA FC, Kano Golden Stars and Bank of the North FC, Kano Pillars achieved outstanding success by winning the 2007–08 Nigerian Premier League. Kano Pillars produced players like Abiodun Baruwa who has since played for Swiss, Austrian, Welsh and British Clubs and Sani Kaita who later plays for Sparta Rotterdam in the Netherlands. Another Prominent player is Ahmed Garba 'Yaro Yaro' who later plays for AB in Denmark and a notable player from Kano Pillars FC is Ahmed Musa who played for Leicester City in the English Premier league after joining from CSKA Moscow. It was registered as a limited liability company with the Corporate Affairs Commission, Nigeria, and then registered with the Nigeria Football Association (NFA) as a professional football club. The Kano Pillars drew an average home league attendance of 10,000 in the 2016 league season.

In the 2020/2021 NPFL season, Kano Pillars were fined a whopping sum of ₦7,500,000.00 for failing to follow the orders of the LMC and NFF, which prohibited fans from viewing live games in the stadium. Fans disrupted a top table clash between Akwa United and Kano Pillars. The game ended 0-0 after it was concluded the following day.

They were relegated from NPFL on 16 July 2022 following the confirmation of a verdict against them for the deduction of 3 points, despite an appeal which the NFF committee disregarded against their complaint.
The verdict on them was a penalty for what their former chairman did to match officials in their encounter with Dakkada FC

2009 Champions League
They are also nicknamed "Ahly Killers" as they scored 2 magnificent goals in Egypt and drew with Al Ahly Cairo in Egypt 2–2 and 1–1 in Nigeria, so the Ahly Killers went to the Group stage in the African Champions League on the away goals rule. They made it to the semi-finals before being eliminated against fellow Nigerian team Heartland.

Achievements
Nigerian Premier League
Champions (4): 2007–08, 2011–12, 2013, 2014.
Runners-up (1): 2009–10.

Nigerian FA Cup
Winners (2): 2019, 1953
Runners-up (2): 1991, 2018.

Nigerian super cup. 1.winners  2008.
"'Nigerian super four"'. (runners up)2.

Performance in CAF competitions
CAF Champions League: 6 appearances

2009 – Semi-finals
2011 – First Round
2013 – First Round
2014 – Preliminary Round
2015 – First Round
2020 – Preliminary Round

CAF Confederation Cup: 0 appearance

Current players
As of 12 February 2023

Staff
Head Coach/Technical Adviser
 Lionel Emmanuel Soccoia

Chairman
 Tukur Babangida

general manager
  Umar Babangida (Little)

General Coordinator
  Salisu Yaro

Kit Manager
  Habibu Zubair Abubakar

Marketing Manager
  Sani Lawal Mohammed

Notable coaches
 Malik Jabir (2008–) (Technical Adviser)
 Ahmed Pele Abdu
 Ladan Bosso
 Baba Ganaru
 Kadiri Ikhana (1991), (1997–98), (2007–08), (2016–date)
 Ivo Sajh (2009)

Notable players
 Rabiu Ali
 Ahmed Musa
 Junior Lokosa
 Chinedu Udoji
 Ndubisi Chukunyere

References

External links
Kano Pillars FC Official Website

 
Football clubs in Nigeria
Kano State
Kano
Association football clubs established in 1990
1990 establishments in Nigeria
Sports clubs in Nigeria